The Golden Trail is a 1940 American Western film directed by Albert Herman and starring Tex Ritter, Stanley Price and Gene Alsace.

Plot

Cast

References

Bibliography
 Bernard A. Drew. Motion Picture Series and Sequels: A Reference Guide. Routledge, 2013.

External links
 

1940 films
1940 Western (genre) films
American black-and-white films
American Western (genre) films
Films directed by Albert Herman
Monogram Pictures films
1940s English-language films
1940s American films